Trox gansuensis is a species of hide beetle in the subfamily Troginae. Within the genus Trox, it is placed in the core subgenus Trox.

References

gansuensis
Beetles described in 2003